Donato Veneziano was an Italian painter of the Renaissance period. He was an artist living at Venice between 1438 and 1460, was probably a pupil of Jacobello del Fiore. A winged Lion between SS. Jerome and Augustine, in the magazine of the Palazzo Pubblico, Venice.

References

15th-century Venetian people
15th-century Italian painters
Italian male painters
Painters from Venice
Italian Renaissance painters
Year of death unknown
Year of birth unknown